Aridaman Jit Singh (born 26 February 1960) is an Ex-Indian Border Security Force Officer and Author of the book At War. He served in Border Security Force for 20 years and resigned from there for facing limitations to his crusade against organized crime and corruption in Indian Police Organizations. He remain associated with NATO's High Readiness forces (Land) as international trainer and participated in international training exercises of NATO. He is associated with Nishan as its Director and spearheading the campaign that is dedicated to democratization of colonial governance apparatus of India. He also worked as trainer for REDR.

Early life 
He was born on 26 February 1960 in Sri Ganganagar, Rajasthan. His father did work with Rajasthan Police/RAC. His Family comes from army background with his Grandfather Subedaar Harnam Singh having participated in World War I. He got his early education at Jaisalmer, Raisinghnagar and Sri Ganganagar. He Did his BA from Panjab University, Chandigarh and MA in History from Kurukshetra University in 1983.

Career 
He passed out from BSF Academy, Tekanpur in 1985 October as Direct entry Assistant Commandant and inducted in National Security Guards of India. He also did work as a Platoon Commander/Coy Commander on Internal Security Duty in Punjab between April 1984 to September 1989 and got promoted to the rank of Deputy Commandant (Dy Comdt).

He worked as Head of Vigilance and Counter intelligence team of Country Headquarters of Border Security Force. He also remain associated with Deputy Prime Minister's Office and Ministry of Home Affairs as its nodal officer.

Before taking voluntary retirement, he was associated with the training and policy formulation at country Headquarters of Border Security Force.

Activism 
He took to activism since 2003 and remains at the fore front of campaign dedicated to democratization of India's Colonial criminal Justice System.

Other works 
 At War; Nishan Publisher; 2015; Aridaman Jit Singh 
 Aridaman Jit Singh on Fake Encounters by Police in Indian States.
 Fair and Square with Aridaman Jit Singh by Kanwar Sandhu.
 Kesri Lehar UK -Aridaman jit Singh Ex-BSF Officer on Laws of lawlessness in India
 State terror and Sikh genocide with Aridaman Jit Singh, Jarnail Singh and Jasbir Singh. 
 Aridaman Jit Singh and the issues with Union Government of India and Indian Judiciary.

References 
 http://www.sunday-guardian.com/investigation/60-of-delhis-mammoth-police-force-chaperone-vips-as-rapists-run-riot
 https://www.scribd.com/user/69387909/Aridaman-Jit-Singh
 http://epaper.risingkashmir.com/PopUp.aspx?8ZkljZ_ppDowp3W1cSVExXbw_ep_ep
 http://www.gfilesindia.com/decriminalising-the-victims/
 http://namospeaks.blogspot.in/2016/07/unrest-in-northeast-india-is-due-to.html
 http://e-pao.net/epSubPageExtractor.asp?src=reviews.books.At_War_Four_Pillars_of_Falsehood_Book_Review_By_Mohen_Naorem

Law enforcement agencies of India
Living people
1960 births